This article lists events that occurred during 1964 in Estonia.

Incumbents

Events
Kalamaja Cemetery was destroyed by Soviet authorities.

Births

Deaths

References

 
1960s in Estonia
Estonia
Estonia
Years of the 20th century in Estonia